Stephen Coppinger (born 24 September 1984 in Dublin, Ireland) is a former professional squash player who represented South Africa. He reached a career-high world ranking of World No. 14 in April 2015.

References

External links 
 
 

1984 births
Living people
South African male squash players
Sportspeople from Cape Town
Alumni of Hilton College (South Africa)
21st-century South African people